Jelicich is a surname. Notable people with the surname include:

 Dorothy Jelicich (1928–2015), New Zealand politician
 Stephen Jelicich (1923–2015), New Zealand architect and historian

See also
Jeličić